Life's Shadows may refer to:
 Life's Shadows (1916 Dutch film), a silent crime film directed by Theo Frenkel
 Life's Shadows (1916 American film), a silent drama film directed by William Nigh